Carl Fredrik Gustaf Wachtmeister (born 23 June 1989) is a Swedish footballer who plays for Trelleborgs FF as a goalkeeper.

References

External links
  (archive)

1989 births
Living people
Association football goalkeepers
Trelleborgs FF players
Allsvenskan players
Superettan players
Swedish footballers